Newmarket Road was the home ground for Norwich City, before they moved to The Nest.

Today, the club plays at Carrow Road, which has been their home ground since 1935.

History
Norwich City F.C. played at Newmarket Road from the club's founding in 1902 to 1908, with a record attendance of 10,366 in a match against Sheffield Wednesday in a second round FA Cup match in 1908. Following a dispute over the conditions of renting the Newmarket Road ground, in 1908, the club moved to a new home, in a converted disused chalk pit in Rosary Road which became known as "The Nest".

Today
The site was later purchased by the Town Close House Preparatory & Pre-Preparatory School, which still owns it today. After World War II, Norwich CEYMS played at the ground for a time until the school required it for its own use.

References

Norwich City F.C.
Sports venues in Norwich
Defunct football venues in England
Sports venues completed in 1902